Hidayet Heydarov (born 27 July 1997) is an Azerbaijani judoka who won a gold medal at the 2017 European Judo Championships. He defeated his teammate Rustam Orujov at the 2017 Islamic Solidarity Games final.

Biography
Hidayat Heydarov was born on July 27, 1997 in the city of Karaganda, Kazakh SSR. The Heydarov family hails from the village of Alxasava Goychay region. When Khidayat was 3 years old, the family moved to Baku. At the age of 6, Heydarov's father enrolled him in the judo section of the Specialized Children and Youth Sports School of Olympic Reserves No. 13, located near the Neftchilar metro station. His first coach was Tarlan Hasanov, who is still him today.

In 2012 he won a bronze medal at the Azerbaijan Youth Championship. In 2013 and 2014 became the European champion among youths in weight up to 60 and 66 kg, respectively. In 2013 he won the national championship.

In 2014 he entered the Azerbaijan State Academy of Physical Culture and Sports

In 2015 in Abu Dhabi he became the world champion among juniors, and a year later in Malaga he became the European champion among juniors, and in Orenburg he won the European Cup. In 2017 he took bronze at the Grand Slam tournament in Paris. And in the same year he became the European champion in judo in the weight category up to 73 kg, having beaten Musa Mogushkov from Russia in the final. Thus, Heydarov became the only judoka who won all four European titles, and the European Judo Union named him the best young judoka in Europe.

At the 2017 World Championship, which was his debut, Heydarov managed to reach the semifinals, where, losing to the Japanese Soichi Hashimoto, he began to fight for bronze. Heydarov also lost this fight with Odbayar Gandbaatar from Mongolia and took 5th place. In October 2017, he became the winner of the World Youth Championship (U-21) in Zagreb, where he defeated Bilal Ciloglu from Turkey in the final. In December, Heydarov took part in the World Masters tournament in St. Petersburg, where he won a bronze medal, defeating Odbayar Gandbaatar from Mongolia in the decisive fight, to whom he lost a few months earlier at the World Championship. This was the first World Masters medal in the career of a young judoka. In 2018 he won a silver medal at the European Championship and a bronze medal at his home world championship. At the 2019 European Games, he took a bronze medal, defeating European champion Ferdinand Karapetyan from Armenia, to whom he lost at last year's European Championship, and 2012 Olympic champion Lasha Shavdatuashvili from Georgia in repechage matches. In addition, Heydarov was also awarded a bronze medal of the European Championship, since this is the status that judo competitions at the European Games in Minsk had. At the 2019 pre-Olympic World Championships, which was held in Tokyo, he won a bronze medal, defeating an opponent from Tajikistan Behruz Khojazoda in a duel for third place.

He won the gold medal in his event at the 2022 Judo Grand Slam Tel Aviv held in Tel Aviv, Israel.

References

External links

 
 
 

Azerbaijani male judoka
1997 births
Living people
Sportspeople from Karaganda
Judoka at the 2019 European Games
European Games medalists in judo
European Games bronze medalists for Azerbaijan
Universiade medalists in judo
Universiade silver medalists for Azerbaijan
Universiade bronze medalists for Azerbaijan
Medalists at the 2019 Summer Universiade
Islamic Solidarity Games medalists in judo
21st-century Azerbaijani people